Hellerhof is a quarter of the city of Düsseldorf, part of Borough 10. Düsseldorf-Hellerhof is in the far southeast part of Düsseldorf. It connects Düsseldorf with the towns of Langenfeld and Monheim am Rhein. It is a young quarter, founded in the middle 1970s.

In contrast to its direct neighbour Garath, which consists mainly of projects, Hellerhof is socially in a far better social situation because there is much detached and semi-detached housing and only a few blocks of flats.

The name comes from an old farm, the Hellerhof (Heller's farm).

There is a commuter railway S-Bahn station and one bus line connecting Hellerhof with the rest of Düsseldorf.

References

Urban districts and boroughs of Düsseldorf